This is the discography of the German pop-rock band Reamonn.

Reamonn has released five studio albums, three live albums, one compilation album, 24 singles and two music DVDs by Island Records and Virgin Records.



Albums

Studio albums

Live albums

Compilation albums

Singles

DVDs 
 2004: Raise Your Hands
 2006: Wish (Live)

References

External links 
Discography at Reamonn's official website
Discography at laut.de 
Discography at Poplexikon.de 

Reamonn
Rock music group discographies